Gartnait son of Girom was a king of the Picts from 531 to 537.

The Pictish Chronicle king lists have him ruling for six or seven years between Drest IV and Cailtram.

Cailtram is said to have been Gartnait's brother and three sons of Girom are successively listed as king, although Drest son of Girom is not explicitly stated to have been a brother of Gartnait and Cailtram.

Historian Damian Bullen has suggested that Gartnait is the historical figure behind the myth of King Arthur and that he had his residence in Rhynie in Aberdeenshire. He identifies his mother Girom as Gigurnus, Gygurn or Igraine while his father Uudrost as Uther Pendragon, and king Cailtram who ruled after him as Sir Kay of legends.

References

Anderson, Alan Orr, Early Sources of Scottish History A.D 500–1286, volume 1. Reprinted with corrections. Paul Watkins, Stamford, 1990.

External links
Pictish Chronicle 

537 deaths
Pictish monarchs
6th-century Scottish monarchs
Year of birth unknown
Historical figures as candidates of King Arthur